Onslowiaceae is the only family in order Onslowiales in the brown algae (class Phaeophyceae).  The family contains only the genera Onslowia and Verosphacela.

References

Brown algae families
Brown algae